The Rafiganj rail disaster was the derailment of a train on a bridge over the Dhave River in North-Central India, on 10 September 2002.  At least 130 people were killed in the accident, which was reportedly due to sabotage by a local Maoist terrorist group, the Naxalites.

Overview 
The accident occurred at 10:40 PM, when the Eastern Railway's high-speed, luxury Howrah Rajdhani Express train travelling at a speed of 130km/hr derailed on a 300-foot bridge over the Dhave River near the town of Rafiganj near Gaya. It was led by a Ghaziabad based WAP5 locomotive in those times.

The train had left Howrah with over 1,000 people on board six hours before, and was heading towards New Delhi when the tragedy happened.  Fifteen of the eighteen train cars derailed and fell across the tracks, two of them tumbling into the river beneath. People from other carriages were also thrown into the water by the force of the crash.

Rescuers, including local military forces, were hampered by the region's poor roads, which become muddy streams in rainstorms.  This occurred the evening of the crash.  Local people attempted to give what aid they could, and 125 people were pulled to safety by morning, but nothing could be done for those trapped in the carriages that had fallen into the swollen river.  

The death toll continued to rise over the next weeks.  The river was searched for bodies.  Several were found near villages downstream. The full death toll is unlikely to ever be known. In all, 130 bodies were recovered, but some sources claim that as many as 50 people are still missing, although the government has not responded to this issue. Some news reports give the figure of those killed as high as 200. At least 150 people were injured.

The cause of the crash was not immediately obvious, but it was originally thought that rust and metal fatigue on the colonial era bridge contributed to a shift in the structure which cracked the rails, perhaps as a result of the heavy rains in the area. A railway employee commented that "The bridge was considered weak for a long time", but as in the Kadalundi River rail disaster of thirteen months previously, nothing was done to repair the structure.

A later enquiry reported the cause as sabotage, pointing to missing "fish plates" which were intended to anchor the rails to the bridge. These had apparently been removed at some point shortly before the crash. The investigators reported that the plates had probably been removed by Naxalites, who were conducting a low-intensity guerrilla war at the time. The leaders of their organisation, the People's War Group had recently been arrested, and this was described as a being a revenge attack.

Other commentators have questioned this view, some claiming that fish plates were not missing at all, or that they were dislodged during the crash and fell into the river. Others assert that the fish plates may have been  missing either through common theft for scrap metal or through the shifting of the weakened bridge shortly before the accident. The Naxalites themselves have not claimed credit for the "attack", and have never been known to target trains before.

External links
 Early News Report
 INS News on enquiry
 Red Cross News Report
 CBS Report on possible sabotage
 The sabotage debate

2002 disasters in India
21st-century mass murder in India
Mass murder in 2002
Terrorist incidents in India in 2002
Railway accidents in 2002
Derailments in India
Train wrecks caused by sabotage
Railway accidents and incidents in Bihar
Naxalite–Maoist insurgency
History of Bihar (1947–present)
Bridge disasters in India
Bridge disasters caused by terrorism
Aurangabad district, Bihar
Crime in Bihar
September 2002 events in India